John Hendricks may refer to:

Jack Hendricks (1875–1943), American baseball player and manager
John Hendricks (born 1952), American television executive
John Hendricks (cricketer) (born 1956), South African cricketer
John Allen Hendricks (born 1970), American academic
John R. Hendricks (1929–2007), Canadian mathematician 
John Shannon Hendrix (born 1959), American architectural historian and philosopher 
John W. Hendrix (born 1942), American armed forces general and commander
Johny Hendricks (born 1983), American wrestler and mixed martial artist
Jon Hendricks (1921–2017), American jazz musician
Jon Hendricks (born 1939), American activist, artist, and curator
Jon Henricks (born 1935), Australian swimmer